The 2007–08 Professional Golf Tour of India was the second season of the Professional Golf Tour of India.

Mukesh Kumar won the Order of Merit, having won four tournaments during the season.

Schedule
The following table lists official events during the 2007–08 season.

Order of Merit
The Order of Merit was based on prize money won during the season, calculated in Indian rupees.

Notes

References

2007-08
2007 in golf
2008 in golf